Squeezelite is one of several software clients available for Logitech Media Server. Squeezelite does not have any user interface of its own and must be controlled via Logitech Media Server's web interface or another Logitech Media Server client.

Features
Squeezelite supports gapless playback, a wide range of sample rates (44.1 kHz / 48 kHz / 88.2 kHz / 96 kHz / 176.4 kHz / 192 kHz / 352.8 kHz / 384 kHz) and direct streaming for Logitech Media Server plugins that require it such as Spotify. It is capable of utilizing Logitech Media Server's client synchronization feature which allows grouping clients for simultaneous, synchronized music playback. Squeezelite uses ALSA for audio output on Linux and PortAudio for other platforms.

History
Development of Squeezelite began in 2012 in response to the technical limitations of other Logitech Media Server software clients. The first stable version of Squeezelite was released on February 15, 2013.

References

Streaming software